The Beggar Student is a 1931 German operetta film directed by Victor Janson and starring Hans-Heinz Bollmann, Jarmila Novotná and Fritz Schulz. The film is based on the 1882 operetta The Beggar Student. A British version of the film The Beggar Student was also released the same year.

The film's art direction was by Botho Hoefer and Bernhard Schwidewski.

Cast
Hans-Heinz Bollmann as Symon
Jarmila Novotná as Laura
Fritz Schulz as Jan
Truus van Aalten as Bronislava
Hansi Arnstaedt as Gräfin Palmatica Nowalska
Paul Westermeier as Oberst Ollendorf
Hans Jaray as Henrici
Hermann Picha as Enterich
Paul Biensfeldt as Nepomuk

References

External links

German historical musical films
1930s historical musical films
Operetta films
Films directed by Victor Janson
Films set in Poland
Films set in the 18th century
Films of the Weimar Republic
Films based on operettas
German multilingual films
German black-and-white films
1931 multilingual films
1930s German-language films
1930s German films